The Klein and Sutmar Block on Main Avenue in Oakes, North Dakota was built in 1904.  It includes Italianate architecture.

It was listed on the National Register of Historic Places in 1987.

According to its NRHP nomination, out of all of Oakes buildings, it "is the single remaining building with an ornate pressed
metal facade."

References

Commercial buildings on the National Register of Historic Places in North Dakota
Italianate architecture in North Dakota
Commercial buildings completed in 1904
National Register of Historic Places in Dickey County, North Dakota
1904 establishments in North Dakota